Boreyko is a Polish coat of arms. It was used by several szlachta families in the times of the Polish–Lithuanian Commonwealth.

History
The symbol of a swastika was also popular with the nobility. Prior to Christianity, this sign was painted on the shields of knights. According to chronicles, prince Oleg who in the 9th century with his Rus Vikings had captured Constantinople, had nailed his shield to the cities gates, which had a large red Swastika painted on it. The noble house of Boreyko from Ruthenia also had swastikas as their coat of arms. The family had reached its greatness in the 14th and 15th centuries and their crest can be seen in many heraldry books produced at that time. The origin of the family is tracked back to the eastern regions of today's Ukraine. During several centuries the Boreyko noble families united against the Tsar Kingdom of Russia.

Blazon
On silver shield figure at swastika form, which vertical pillar on ends twince broken. Crown over helmet, by Samuel Orgelbrand.

Notable bearers
Notable bearers of this coat of arms include: Borejko, Boreyko, Boyko, Borejka, Borzym, Radzichowski, Radziechowski.

During the Second World War families by these surnames living in the Polish–Lithuanian regions changed them in order to avoid persecution by the Soviet and/or Nazi authorities.

Alternative surnames : Bouejko, Bolejko, Borym, Radzikowski, etc.

 Walery Eljasz-Radzikowski painter and photographer
 Andrey Boreyko  conductor

See also
 Polish heraldry
 Heraldic family
 List of Polish nobility coats of arms

References

Bibliography
 
 Encyklopedia powszechna Samuela Orgelbranda, 1901.

Polish coats of arms
Ukrainian coats of arms
Swastika